The 2022 World Para Swimming Championships was the 11th edition of the World Para Swimming Championships, an international swimming competition for athletes with a disability. It was held in Madeira from 12 to 18 June.

The competition was originally scheduled to be held in 2021, however, it was moved to the summer of 2022 due to the postponement of the Paralympic Games in Tokyo from 2020 to 2021. The event featured 488 athletes from 59 countries.

Participating nations 
Russia and Belarus were banned from attending all international competitions due to the 2022 Russian invasion of Ukraine. China also did not compete.

 (19)
 (20)
 (4)
 (2)
 (3)
 (29)
 (30)
 (6)
 (11)
 (1)
 (3)
 (1)
 (8)
 (1)
 (2)
 (1)
 (5)
 (2)
 (4)
 (12)
 (2)
 (11)
 (28)
 (12)
 (7)
 (5)
 (6)
 (5)
 (6)
 (23)
 (16)
 (4)
 (2)
 (1)
 (2)
 (2)
 (26)
 (1)
 (8)
 (5)
 (1)
 (1)
 (2)
 (13)
 (10)
 (1)
 (4)
 (3)
 (4)
 (4)
 (37)
 (5)
 (2)
 (6)
 (7)
 (23)
 (23)
 (5)
 (2)

Schedule 
Purple squares mark final heats scheduled.

Multi-medalists 
List of male and female multi-medalists who have won three gold medals or five medals.

Men

Women

Medal table 
The medal table as of day 7.

References 

 
2022 in swimming
2022 in disability sport
World Para Swimming
International aquatics competitions hosted by Portugal
Swimming competitions in Portugal
Sports competitions in Portugal
Sports events postponed due to the COVID-19 pandemic
2022 in Portuguese sport